Sheila Jackson Lee (born January 12, 1950) is an American lawyer and politician who is the U.S. representative for , having served since 1995. The district includes most of central Houston. She is a member of the Democratic Party, and served as an at-large member of the Houston City Council before being elected to the House.

Jackson Lee and Representative Lloyd Doggett became co-deans of Texas's congressional delegation after Eddie Bernice Johnson retired.

Early life and education

Jackson Lee was born Sheila Jackson in Queens, New York. Her father, Ezra Clyde Jackson, who was born in Brooklyn, was a comic book artist and the son of Jamaican immigrants; her mother, Ivalita Bennett Jackson, was a nurse, and came to New York at an early age from her birthplace of St. Petersburg, Florida. Jackson Lee graduated from Jamaica High School in Queens. She earned a BA in political science from Yale University in 1972 and a JD from the University of Virginia School of Law in 1975. She is a member of the Alpha Kappa Alpha sorority.

Early career in Texas
Jackson Lee made three unsuccessful attempts at local judgeships before becoming a Houston, Texas municipal judge from 1987 to 1990. Along with Sylvia Garcia, Jackson Lee was appointed by then Mayor of Houston Kathy Whitmire.

In 1989, Jackson Lee won the at-large position for a seat on the Houston City Council, serving until 1994. On the city council, she helped pass a safety ordinance that required parents to keep their guns away from children. She also worked for expanded summer hours at city parks and recreation centers as a way to combat gang violence.

U.S. House of Representatives

Elections

1994
In 1994, Jackson Lee challenged four-term incumbent U.S. Representative Craig Washington in the Democratic primary. Washington had come under fire for opposing several projects that would have benefited the Houston area. Jackson Lee defeated Washington, 63% to 37%. The victory was tantamount to election in this heavily Democratic, black-majority district. In the general election, she defeated Republican nominee Jerry Burley, 73%–24%.

1996–2008
During this period, Jackson Lee was never challenged in the Democratic primary. She was reelected with at least 76% of the vote in every election.

2010

For the first time in her congressional career, Jackson Lee was challenged in the Democratic primary; her opponents were Houston City Councilmember Jarvis Johnson and Sean Roberts. She defeated them, 67%–28%-5%.

It was reported that in October 2010 Jackson Lee was "asking the Department of Justice to investigate whether tea party groups are intimidating black and Hispanic voters in her district." She requested that Attorney General Eric Holder send poll monitors to make sure that no local group was stopping people from voting.

She won the general election with 70% of the vote, the lowest proportion of her career.

2012

In 2012, Jackson Lee was unopposed in the Democratic primary and won the general election with 75% of the vote.

2014

Jackson Lee defeated Republican nominee Sean Seibert, 71.78% to 24.76%. She received 76,097 votes to Seibert's 26,049. Green Party candidate Remington Alessi and independent Vince Duncan received the remainder.

2016

Four candidates competed in the March 1 Republican primary election. Lori Bartley, with 5,679 votes (33.7%), led the field and faced a runoff on April 24 with the second-placed contender, Reggie Gonzales, who drew 5,578 votes (33.1%). Two other contenders, Sharon Joy Fisher with 4,405 votes (26.1%) and Ave Reynero Pate (7.13%), took the remainder of the vote. Bartley defeated Gonzales, 58% to 42%.

In the general election, Jackson Lee defeated Bartley, 73.5% to 23.64%. She received 150,157 votes to Bartley's 48,306. Green Party candidate Tom Kleven received 5,845 votes.

2018

In the Democratic primary, Jackson Lee defeated Richard Johnson, 85.3% to 14.7%. In the general election, she defeated Republican nominee Ave Reynero Pate, 75.25% to 20.81%. Libertarian Luke Spencer and independent Vince Duncan received the remainder of the vote.

2020 

In the Democratic primary, Jackson Lee defeated seven other candidates with 77% of the vote. In the general election, she defeated Pate again, 73.3% to 23.5%. Libertarian Luke Spencer and independent Vince Duncan received the remainder of the vote.

Tenure

Before the 110th Congress, Jackson Lee served on the House Science Committee and on the Subcommittee that oversees space policy and NASA. She is a member of the Congressional Black Caucus, and a CBC whip. She is known to be gaffe-prone and has a reputation for treating staffers poorly.

Foreign policy
In 2000, Jackson Lee favored permanently normalizing trade status for China, arguing that it would aid both human rights and Houston's economy.

Jackson Lee traveled to the 2001 World Conference against Racism in South Africa, and has backed sanctions against Sudan. On April 28, 2006, along with four other members of Congress and six other activists, she was arrested for disorderly conduct in front of Sudan's embassy in Washington. They were protesting the role of Sudan's government in ethnic cleansing in Darfur.

Jackson Lee has urged better relations between the U.S. and Venezuela, which she describes as a friendly nation. She said the U.S. should reconsider its ban on selling F-16 fighter jets and spare parts to Venezuela. The U.S. State Department bans such sales due to "lack of support" for counter-terrorist operations and Venezuela's relations with Iran and Cuba.

In July 2010, Jackson Lee said: "Today, we have two Vietnams, side by side, North and South, exchanging and working. We may not agree with all that North Vietnam is doing, but they are living in peace. I would look for a better human rights record for North Vietnam, but they are living side by side." It was noted that Vietnam had not been split for four decades, and that Vietnam's government does not consider South Vietnam to have ever been a sovereign state.

Jackson Lee condemned President Erdoğan's wide-ranging crackdown on dissent following a failed July 2016 coup in Turkey.

Immigration
Jackson Lee is active on immigration issues. She has proposed increasing border security and increasing opportunities for legalization among those living in the U.S. She has opposed a guest worker program, saying that the idea "connotate[s] 'invite, come,' and, at the same time, it misleads because you ask people to come for a temporary job of three to six years and they have to leave if they don't have another job and I would think that they would not."

Criticism of Tea Party
Speaking at the July 2010 NAACP national convention, Jackson Lee compared the Tea Party to the KKK.

WikiLeaks
In an October 2016 MSNBC interview, Jackson Lee mistakenly denounced Wikipedia when she meant WikiLeaks. The story concerned the Hillary Clinton email controversy. Jackson said, "You know that I'm going to first of all denounce the use of this intrusion by Wikipedia through the Russian intrusion" and "This is what it's about. Espionage just like what was said over these last couple of days. We need to be concerned about the intrusion of Russia and Putin in these elections."

Health care
In January 2011, Jackson Lee said that repealing the Patient Protection and Affordable Care Act would violate the Constitution, arguing that the act is constitutional under the Commerce Clause, and that repealing it would violate both the Fifth and the Fourteenth Amendments.

Al-Qaeda
At a March 2011 Homeland Security Committee hearing on radical Muslims in the U.S., Jackson Lee said that Peter King's hearings were helping al-Qaeda and "going the same route as Arizona." She complained that the hearings were scaring Muslim Americans and called them "an outrage".

Legislation
On September 27, 2013, Jackson Lee introduced the Essential Transportation Worker Identification Credential Assessment Act (H.R. 3202; 113th Congress), a bill that would direct the United States Department of Homeland Security to assess the effectiveness of the Transportation Worker Identification Credential (TWIC) program. The bill would require an independent assessment of how well the TWIC program improves security and reduces risks at the facilities and vessels it is responsible for.

On January 4, 2021, Jackson Lee introduced the Sabika Sheikh Firearm Licensing and Registration Act (H.R. 127; 117th Congress), a bill that expanded requirements for firearm licensing to every firearm and banned any ammunition of .50 caliber BMG or larger.

LGBT rights
Jackson Lee voted present on the Defense of Marriage Act.

Jackson Lee supports LGBT rights. In 2009, she voted for the Matthew Shepard and James Byrd Jr. Hate Crimes Prevention Act, a bill that expanded the federal hate crime law to cover crimes biased by the victim's sexual orientation or gender identity. In 2010, she voted for the Don't Ask, Don't Tell Repeal Act.

Jackson Lee supports the Equality Act, a bill that would expand the federal Civil Rights Act of 1964 to ban discrimination based on sexual orientation and gender identity. She voted for the bill in 2019. Jackson Lee criticized Republican representatives who opposed the legislation on religious grounds.

Presidential election objections
In 2001, Jackson Lee and other House members objected to counting Florida's electoral votes, which George W. Bush narrowly won after a contentious recount in the 2000 presidential election. Because no senator joined the objection, it was dismissed by Senate President Al Gore.

In 2005, Jackson Lee was one of the 31 House Democrats who voted not to count Ohio's electoral votes in the 2004 presidential election. Without Ohio's electoral votes, the election would have been decided by the U.S. House of Representatives, with each state having one vote in accordance with the Twelfth Amendment to the United States Constitution.

During the 2017 United States Electoral College vote count, Jackson Lee objected to counting North Carolina's, South Carolina's and Wyoming's electoral votes in the 2016 presidential election. Because no senator joined her objections, they were dismissed.

Hurricane naming
In 2003, Jackson Lee complained that storm names were too white. "All racial groups should be represented", she said, and asked officials to "try to be inclusive of African-American names."

Foreign travel
In May 2015, Jackson Lee took a trip to Azerbaijan paid for by the Azerbaijani government.

Confederate flag
On July 9, 2015, Jackson Lee and others who were engaged in a debate over the Confederate battle flag produced an erroneous reproduction of the original flag. The original battle flag contained 13 stars representing each state of the Confederacy as of 1861. The flag that Jackson Lee presented to members of Congress contained 17 stars.

United Airlines issue
On December 24, 2017, United Airlines allegedly gave a passenger's first class seat away to Jackson Lee. United Airlines claimed that the 63-year-old passenger had canceled her flight, which the passenger denied, alleging that the airline threatened to kick her off the flight for her complaint and for trying to take a picture of Jackson Lee. Jackson Lee released the following statement:

Staff turnover
In 1998, The Houston Press reported that five of Jackson Lee's staffers had quit that spring: "According to Lee's former Capitol office executive assistant and events scheduler Rhiannon Burruss, the congresswoman's abrasive ways not only drove off staff members but irritated Continental Airlines staffers to the point where one suggested she fly on a competitor instead."

In 2011, Jackson Lee was reported to have one of the highest staff turnover rates in Congress. The Huffington Post and Houston Chronicle reported that she had gone through 11 chiefs of staff in 11 years. A 2013 report concluded that "the veteran Texas Democrat had the highest turnover rate for all of Congress over the past decade." She again topped the 2017 edition of the biennial Washingtonian survey and 2018 turnover statistics.

Resignation from the CBCF 
In January 2019, The New York Times reported that Jackson Lee planned to resign as chair of the Congressional Black Caucus Foundation. The move came in the wake of a lawsuit filed by a former staffer earlier in January that claimed the staffer was fired in retaliation for her planned legal action related to an alleged rape by a supervisor in 2015. The resignation came the day after the National Alliance to End Sexual Violence announced it would not support making Jackson Lee the lead sponsor of a law to reauthorize the federal Violence Against Women Act. She also stepped down from her chairmanship of the House Judiciary subcommittee.

Committee assignments

 Committee on the Judiciary
 Subcommittee on Crime, Terrorism, and Homeland Security
 Subcommittee on Immigration and Border Security
 Committee on Homeland Security   
 Subcommittee on Cybersecurity, Infrastructure Protection, and Security Technologies
 Subcommittee on Counterterrorism and Intelligence
  Committee on the Budget

Caucus memberships
Jackson Lee is or has been a member of a number of caucuses, including: 
The 9-11 Commission Caucus
The Building a Better America Caucus (BABAC)
The Congressional Caucus on Global Road Safety
The Congressional Human Rights Caucus. 
The Congressional Algeria Caucus
The Congressional Pakistan Caucus
The US-Afghan Caucus
Veterinary Medicine Caucus
Congressional Progressive Caucus.
House Baltic Caucus
Congressional Arts Caucus
Afterschool Caucuses
Congressional NextGen 9-1-1 Caucus
United States Congressional International Conservation Caucus
U.S.-Japan Caucus
Medicare for All Caucus

Personal life
Jackson Lee moved to Houston after her husband, Elwyn Lee, took a job at the University of Houston. Her husband is now Vice Chancellor and Vice President for Student Affairs of the University of Houston System and the University of Houston, respectively. They have two children.

Jackson Lee is a member of The Links.

Awards and recognition
Hilal-i-Pakistan (Crescent of Pakistan) Award (the highest civil award of Pakistan) from the President of Pakistan in 2020, recognizing her services to Pakistan.

See also
 Politics of Houston
 List of African-American United States representatives
 Women in the United States House of Representatives

References

External links

Congresswoman Sheila Jackson Lee official U.S. House website
Sheila Jackson Lee for U.S. Congress 
 	

|-

1950 births
21st-century American judges
21st-century American politicians
21st-century American women politicians
American politicians of Jamaican descent
American women lawyers
Democratic Party members of the United States House of Representatives from Texas
Female members of the United States House of Representatives
Houston City Council members
Living people
Municipal judges in the United States
People from Queens, New York
Texas state court judges
University of Virginia School of Law alumni
Women city councillors in Texas
Women in Texas politics
Yale University alumni
21st-century American women judges
African-American city council members in Texas